Governor's Lookout Battery is one of the many artillery batteries in the British Overseas Territory of Gibraltar, which served to protect it against its many sieges. It is located off Signal Station Road within the Upper Rock Nature Reserve.

History
Governor's Lookout Battery is located off Signal Station Road within the Upper Rock Nature Reserve on the Rock of Gibraltar which is the likely site of former Governor of Gibraltar General George Augustus Eliott's observation post during the Great Siege of Gibraltar (1779–83). In 1886 it mounted one 9 inch rifled muzzle-loading gun (RML). By July 1904 the battery was intended to carry four 9.2 inch breechloading guns Mk IV but one Mk X on a Mk V mounting was installed instead. The last gun was removed in 1940, during World War II.

Governor's Lookout Battery is currently used by the Gibraltar Scouts Association as their local Scout Camp.

References

Batteries in Gibraltar